Rajsamand is a city, located in Rajsamand district of Rajasthan, western India. The city is named for Rajsamand Lake, an artificial lake created in the 17th century by Rana Raj Singh of Mewar. It is the administrative headquarters of Rajsamand District.

Geography
It has an average elevation of 547 metres (1794 ft).

Demographics

Total population of the Rajsamand district is 987,024 (493,459 male and 493,565 female). This district has a male to female ratio of nearly 1:1. Rajsamand has an average literacy rate of 67%, male literacy is 77%, and female literacy is 57%. In Rajsamand, 15% of the population is under 6 years of age.

Economy
Although most of the economy of Rajasthan is based on agriculture, this part of the state is rich in mineral resources. The area is one of the prime Indian suppliers of marble, granite and other valuable varieties of stone. The Dariba,Sindesar khurd and Zawar mines are the principal Indian sources of ores for zinc, silver, manganese, etc. The majority of the population is engaged in organised and unorganised mining-related works. Others are engaged in tyre and tobacco factories.

Places to see 
Surrounded by the wide ranges of Aravali, it houses the stunning Rajsamand Lake.

 Rajsamand Lake
 Dwarkadhish Temple
 Shrinathji Temple, Nathdwara
 Jaipur
 Chittorgarh
 Pali
 Jaisalmer
 Ranuja

References

External links
 Rajsamand District Hindi Website
 Official Website

Cities and towns in Rajsamand district